Mickey's Eleven is a 1927 silent short film in Larry Darmour's Mickey McGuire series starring a young Mickey Rooney. Directed by Albert Herman, the two-reel short was released to theaters in November 1927 by FBO.

Synopsis
Mickey and the Scorpions play a game of football against Stinky Davis and his team.

Notes
An edited version was released to television in the 1960s as a part of the Those Lovable Scallawags with Their Gangs series.

Cast
Mickey Rooney - Mickey McGuire
Jimmy Robinson - Hambone Johnson
Delia Bogard - Tomboy Taylor
Unknown - Katrinka
Paul Gudelj - Stinky Davis
Kendall McComas - Scorpions member
Albert Schaefer - Chubby scorpions member

External links 
 

1927 films
1927 comedy films
American black-and-white films
American silent short films
Mickey McGuire short film series
1927 short films
Silent American comedy films
American comedy short films
1920s American films